Liberatori "Liberty" DeVitto (born August 8, 1950) is an American rock drummer. He is best known for his work as a drummer for New York singer-songwriter Billy Joel's recording and touring band. He has also been a session drummer on recordings of other artists.  He is credited as a drummer on records that have sold a combined total of 150 million units worldwide.

Early life and education
DeVitto was born in New York City, of Italian ancestry, where his father was a police officer at the New York Police Department. He taught himself to play the drums after seeing The Beatles on their appearance on The Ed Sullivan Show in February 1964. He was also influenced as a teenager by rock drummer Dino Danelli.

Career
DeVitto got his big break in the music business when he was hired to play drums for Billy Joel in the mid-1970s. In an online interview, DeVitto describes how Joel's classic late-1970s/early-1980s band first came together: Billy and I used to play the same club in Plainview, Long Island, called "My House." He was 17 and in a band called The Hassles and I was 16 and in a band called The New Rock Workshop. We would watch each other play and acknowledge each other in passing. In 1974, he was living in Los Angeles and had already released Piano Man and Streetlife Serenade. He used studio musicians for the recording and different guys out on the road. I was playing in a band called Topper with Doug Stegmeyer and he got the gig to play bass with Billy on the "Streetlife" tour. He told Doug that he wanted to move back to New York and find a permanent band he could record and tour with on a regular basis. Doug recommended me because Billy was looking for a New York-type drummer, aggressive and hard hitting, and the rest is history. The three of us recorded the basic tracks for Turnstiles and we both recommended Russell Javors and Howie Emerson, who played guitars in Topper and with the addition of Richie Cannata on saxophone, the "Billy Joel Band" was born.

In addition to his work with Joel, DeVitto has also been an active session musician working with other big acts such as Paul McCartney, Carly Simon, Phoebe Snow, Karen Carpenter, Stevie Nicks, Rick Wakeman, Bob James and Meat Loaf.

After working with Joel for 30 years, DeVitto was discharged from drumming duties for the 2006 Billy Joel tour for an unknown reason. Up to that point, he had the longest running tenure in Joel's band, starting with the recording of 1976's Turnstiles.

As of 2018, DeVitto uses Liberty drums, pedals & hardware, Sabian cymbals, Evans drumheads, Latin Percussion and Pro-Mark drumsticks.

DeVitto appeared on the November/December 2013 cover of Making Music magazine to discuss his life and career.

Around that time he began collaborations with Brooklyn singer-songwriter Michael Sackler-Berner, which led to the founding of band The Slim Kings alongside bassist Andy Attanasio. The Slim Kings released two albums and multiple singles. The band toured with ZZ Top and Los Lonely Boys.

On October 23, 2014, DeVitto, Cannata, and Javors (with Stegmeyer, posthumously) were inducted into the Long Island Music Hall of Fame, primarily for their work with Joel. Shortly thereafter, DeVitto, Cannata, and Javors officially formed The Lords of 52nd Street band; the band also includes a pianist and lead vocalist, keyboardist, and a guitarist, and plays faithful renditions of the recorded Joel originals.

Legal issues
On May 19, 2009, DeVitto filed a lawsuit in Manhattan's state Supreme Court claiming Joel and Sony Music owed him over 10 years worth of royalty payments. DeVitto has never been given songwriting credit on any of Joel's songs. DeVitto's lawyer added that he does not know exactly how much DeVitto is owed, and that Joel's record sales are subject to an audit. In April 2010, it was announced that Joel and DeVitto "amicably resolved" the lawsuit out of court.

Philanthropy
In 2003, DeVitto signed on as an official supporter of Little Kids Rock, a nonprofit organization that provides free musical instruments and instruction to children in underserved public schools throughout the United States. DeVitto has personally delivered instruments to children in the program, performed at benefit events for the cause and sits on the organization's Honorary Board of Directors.

Personal life
Liberty DeVitto is the father of four daughters, Devon (b. 1980), actress and model Torrey (b. 1984), Maryelle (b. 1988) and Mae Elizabeth Josephine on 11 February 2017.

See also
Billy Joel Band

Credits
All albums listed are Billy Joel releases unless otherwise noted.

1976 Turnstiles
1977 The Stranger
1978 52nd Street
1980 Glass Houses
1981 Dead Ringer – with Meat Loaf
1981 The Burning – with Rick Wakeman
1981 Songs in the Attic
1982 The Nylon Curtain
1983 An Innocent Man
1985 Greatest Hits Volume I & II
1985 Spoiled Girl – with Carly Simon
1986 The Bridge
1987 КОНЦЕРТ
1989 Storm Front
1989  Mick Jones – with Mick Jones
1993 River of Dreams
1996 Karen Carpenter – with Karen Carpenter (recorded in 1979–80)
1997 Greatest Hits Volume III
2001 Chiller Theatre – John Babcock
2007 Queen Anne's Revenge – with Sean J. Kennedy
2009 Camp Jam: Rock Solid Drums: Drums (Book/CD) – co-written with Sean J. Kennedy
2010 Gargoyles and Weathervanes – with The White Ravens
2011 Highlights from Piano Men—The Music of Elton and Billy – with The Southern Maine Symphony Orchestra
2011 I Used to Play Drums (Book/CD) – co-written with Sean J. Kennedy
2012 Fresh Socks – with The Slim Kings
2017 Dirty Socks - with The Slim Kings

References

External links
Drummerworld Entry
2013 Audio interview with Liberty DeVitto from the podcast "I'd Hit That"

1950 births
Living people
Musicians from Brooklyn
American session musicians
American rock drummers
American people of Italian descent
Philanthropists from New York (state)
20th-century American drummers
American male drummers
20th-century American male musicians
Billy Joel Band members